Mindy Cook (born September 23, 1988) is an American goalball player who represented the United States at the 2020 Summer Paralympics.

Career
Cook represented the United States at the 2020 Summer Paralympics in goalball and won a silver medal.

Personal life
Cook was born with aniridia, a genetic condition where the iris of the eye does not develop.

References

1988 births
Living people
People from Celina, Ohio
Paralympic goalball players of the United States
Paralympic medalists in goalball
Paralympic silver medalists for the United States
Goalball players at the 2020 Summer Paralympics
Medalists at the 2020 Summer Paralympics
Sportspeople from Ohio